The North Fork Bull Run River is a tributary, about  long, of the Bull Run River in the U.S. state of Oregon. Part of the system that provides drinking water to the city of Portland, it flows generally south through a protected part of the Mount Hood National Forest in Multnomah County. It joins the Bull Run River at Bull Run Reservoir 1.

Course
The river, which begins at Palmer Lake, slightly southeast of Palmer Peak, flows south and slightly west through Multnomah County and the Mount Hood National Forest within the Bull Run Watershed Management Unit (BRWMU). It receives an unnamed tributary from the right as it passes through Latourell Prairie. Another unnamed tributary enters from the left just before the North Fork reaches a United States Geological Survey (USGS) stream gauge and enters Bull Run Reservoir 1, which is part of the Bull Run River mainstem. The North Fork has no named tributaries.

Discharge
Since 1965, the USGS has monitored the flow of the North Fork Bull Run River at a stream gauge at the river mouth.

Watershed
The Bull Run River watershed, which includes the North Fork Bull Run River, drains . The basin, which is the main source of Portland's drinking water, is largely restricted to uses related to water collection, storage, treatment, and forest management. The North Fork Bull Run River basin of  amounts to about 6 percent of the total Bull Run River watershed, which is managed by the Portland Water Bureau and the United States Forest Service.

See also
List of rivers of Oregon
Bull Run National Forest

References

Works cited
McArthur, Lewis A., and McArthur, Lewis L. (2003) [1928]. Oregon Geographic Names, 4th edition. Portland: Oregon Historical Society Press. .
Portland Water Bureau (2007). "Landscape Conditions", Chapter 4 of Current Habitat Conditions in the  Habitat Conservation Plan Area. Portland, Oregon: Portland Water Bureau. Retrieved March 9, 2010.

External links
Sandy River Basin Watershed Council
Sandy River Basin Partners
Forest Service, Mount Hood National Forest

Rivers of Oregon
Rivers of Multnomah County, Oregon
Mount Hood National Forest